Dinuk is a Sinhalese given name. Notable people with the name include:

Dinuk Wijeratne (born 1978), Sri Lankan-born Canadian conductor, composer, and pianist 
Dinuk Wikramanayaka (born 1994), Sri Lankan cricketer 

Sinhalese masculine given names